Rhinogobius lanyuensis is a species of freshwater goby endemic to Taiwan and only found on Orchid Island (=Lanyu, the type locality) and Green Island, off the southeastern coast of Taiwan. Fishbase also lists it from "China".

It has not been evaluated by IUCN but is classified as "near threatened" in the 2012 Redlist of Fresh Water Fishes of Taiwan.

References

lanyuensis
Freshwater fish of Taiwan
Endemic fauna of Taiwan
Fish described in 1998
Taxa named by Chen I-Shiung
Taxa named by Peter J. Miller
Taxa named by Fang Lee-Shing